Bibigon (Russian: Бибигон) was a Russian television channel dedicated to children and adolescents. The channel, a subsidiary of Russia-1 and owned by VGTRK, was first launched on 1 September 2007. It was originally launched as a block in daytime on Russia, Sport and Kultura. Bibigon was only available in Russia and Armenia. The channel was named after the character of Chukovsky's fairytale "The adventures of Bibigon".

The channel was replaced by Karusel on 27 December 2010.

Programs
 Adiboo Adventure
 Argai: The Prophecy
 Famous 5: On the Case
 Marsupilami
 Maya the Bee (TV series)
 Oggy and the Cockroaches
 The Smurfs
 Yakari

References

External links
Official site

Articles needing translation from Russian Wikipedia
Defunct television channels in Russia
Television channels and stations established in 2007
Television channels and stations disestablished in 2010
2007 establishments in Russia
2010 disestablishments in Russia
Russian-language television stations
Children's television networks
Commercial-free television networks